A monument is a structure commemorating a person or event. 

Monument may also refer to:

Places

Europe
 Monument, Newcastle upon Tyne, England
 Monument Metro station
 Bank and Monument stations, interlinked stations on the London Underground, England

North America
 Monument, Colorado, U.S.
 Monument, Kansas, U.S.
 Monument, New Mexico, U.S.
 Monument, Oregon, U.S.
 Monument, Pennsylvania, U.S.
 Monument Island, an uninhabited Canadian arctic island
 Monument station (MBTA), a closed light rail stop in Boston, Massachusetts, U.S.

Arts, entertainment, and media

Music

Groups and labels
Monument Records, an American record label
Monuments (band), an Italian band
Monuments (metal band), a British band

Albums 
Monument (Ultravox album), 1983
Monument (Front Line Assembly album), 1998 
Monument (Seigmen album), 1999
Monument (Grand Magus album), 2003
Monument (Blank & Jones album), 2004
Monument (Scale the Summit album), 2007
Monument (Miss May I album), 2010
Monument (Children Collide album), 2012
Monument (Blutengel album), 2013
Monument (Kollegah album), 2018
Monument (Molchat Doma album), 2020
Monument (Portico Quartet album), 2021
Monuments (DJ Doran album), 1998
Monuments (Edguy album), 2017

Songs
 "Monument", a song by A Day to Remember from their album For Those Who Have Heart (2007)
 "Monument", a song by Avail from their album Front Porch Stories (2002)
 "Monument", a song by Champion from their album Count Our Numbers (2002)
 "Monument", a song by The Crüxshadows from their album The Mystery of the Whisper (1999)
 "Monument", a song by Depeche Mode from their album A Broken Frame (1982)
 "Monument", a song by Fates Warning from their album Inside Out (1994)
 "Monument", a song by Röyksopp & Robyn from their extended play Do It Again (2014)
 "Monument" (Keiino song), a song by KEiiNO, placed 2nd in the Melodi Grand Prix 2021

Other uses in arts, entertainment, and media
 Monument (novel), a 1974 novel by Lloyd Biggle, Jr.
 Monuments (music), also known as historical editions, a category of multi-volume printed music publication
 Monuments (film), a 2021 American film

"The Monument"
 Monument to the Great Fire of London, or "The Monument", London, England
 Monument House, also known as Schweitzer House or "The Monument" (constructed 1989–1990), just outside the Joshua Tree National Park in California, U.S.
 The Monument (British Columbia), a rock formation in British Columbia, Canada

Other uses
 Ancient monument, an early historical structure or monument protected under British Law
Scheduled monument,  a "nationally important" archaeological site or historic building, given protection against unauthorised change
 Cycling monument, the most prestigious one-day professional cycling road races
 Monument istoric (plural: Monumente istorice) or "historic monument(s)", the Romanian term of designation for National Heritage Sites in Romania
Monument School, in Monument, Oregon
Monument (typeface), by Grafotechna

See also

 Archaeological site
 Headstone
Monumental (disambiguation)